The Mack R series is a line of Class 8 heavy-duty trucks introduced in the early 1960s by Mack Trucks. It replaced the very successful Mack B series models. R Model production ran for 40 years until the RD model was discontinued in 2004 and the RB and Mack D series DM models were discontinued in 2005. The first R models introduced were powered by Mack Thermodyne diesel and gasoline engines. In 1973 the R cab was given a makeover to include a deeper rear wall for more room and a new dashboard design.

Model designations

R -  Standard model
RB -  Set back front axle (except in New Zealand - see NZ Mack RB)
RD -  Heavy Duty R
RM -  4x4 Municipal/maintenance chassis
RMM - 6x6 Municipal/maintenance chassis
RS -  Western R series, S stands for steel frame
RL -  Western R series, L stands for Aluminum frame
RW -  Western series, replaced by the Mack Super-Liner
U - Short hood offset cab
DM - Heavy duty U
DMM - All wheel drive DM
Chassis numbers (GVW Rating):
4xx -
6xx -
7xx -
8xx -
Note: the xx is the place holder for the engine code.

Suffix letters:
T - Tractor
S - Six wheel chassis
L - Light weight components
X - Extreme duty

R series 
Mack started to produce the R and RW in 1966 for highway use, the RD and all wheel drive RM were for construction and municipal use. The lightweight RL model followed in 1967, the RW Superliner with a large, rectangular hood and grill in 1977, and the setback front axle RB in the 1990s.

In the 1990s the R and RW were discontinued and the RB was introduced, mostly for severe-duty applications. The hood was modified slightly for the model RB. 2004 was the last year for the RD, and 2006 for the RB.

U and DM series

The “U” and “DM” series were modifications of the “R” series. A short hood, and the shorter “bumper to back of cab” distance, made them useful in straight trucks and in semi-tractors used in congested cities, but caused the engine to intrude into the passenger compartment. To compensate the cab was offset to the left: the engine “doghouse” intruded into the passenger footwell but left the driver’s position intact.

The U was basically a short R, while the DM was an extra heavy duty version of the U often used in 6X4 construction  trucks. Like the RMM, the DMM was all wheel drive, but had not only a short hood/offset cab, but also a set back front axle, requiring a model specific fiberglass hood/fender arrangement.

Engine codes
In 1966 they were: EN - Engine (gasoline), END - Engine Diesel, and ENDT - Engine Diesel Turbocharged, with the three number cu in displacement next.

By 1988 the numbering system had changed slightly. The prefix “D" and "T”, no longer needed as all engines were diesel and turbocharged, were discarded, as was the "N". The prefix “M” was for “Maxidyne” wide power range models, C was for California certified engines. A “6” was for the  I6, “9” was for the  V8, in 1987 the "7”  I6 was introduced. The next three digits were the horsepower rating of the engine, and an “L” suffix indicated an "Econodyne" low speed model. An example of the difference would be the ENDT673 and later E6-200 being similar engines.

Gallery

See also
Mack Trucks
List of Mack Trucks Products

References

R
Vehicles introduced in 1966
Tractor units
Class 8 trucks